Caremar (Campania Regionale Marittima) is an Italian shipping company, a subdivision of state-owned Tirrenia di Navigazione until 2009, when it was transferred to the Campania regional government and later in 2012 to the Mediterranean Shipping Company. It operates in routes from Campania to Capri, Ischia, Procida.

Fleet

Routes

Ischia↔Procida 
Naples↔Capri
Naples↔Casamicciola Terme 
Naples↔Ischia 
Naples↔Procida
Pozzuoli↔Casamicciola Terme
Pozzuoli↔Ischia
Pozzuoli↔Procida
Pozzuoli↔Capri

External links  

 Official website

Transport in Campania
Shipping companies of Italy
Ferry companies of Italy
Tirrenia Compagnia Italiana di Navigazione